Squantum Point Park is a state-owned, public recreation area located on the Squantum peninsula of Quincy, Massachusetts, United States. The park was created on the site of the former Squantum Naval Air Station, which is preserved in a  strip of runway, and the former dockworks of the Bethlehem Shipbuilding Corporation. The park is managed by the Massachusetts Department of Conservation and Recreation and is associated with the development of the Neponset River Reservation.

Activities and amenities
The park provides views of the Boston skyline and opportunities for picnicking, canoeing, bird watching, and shoreline fishing as well as paths for running and in-line skating. It is the eastern terminus of the Quincy RiverWalk, a 2-mile trail along the Quincy side of the Neponset River Estuary, and sits at the eastern end of the Neponset River Greenway.

References

External links

Squantum Point Park Massachusetts Department of Conservation and Recreation
Map of Neponset River Greenway Massachusetts Department of Conservation and Recreation

State parks of Massachusetts
Parks in Norfolk County, Massachusetts
Quincy, Massachusetts
Tourist attractions in Quincy, Massachusetts
2001 establishments in Massachusetts
Protected areas established in 2001